The Assembly of the Republic of Kosovo is the unicameral legislature of the Republic of Kosovo that is directly elected by the people every four years. It was originally established by the United Nations Interim Administration Mission in Kosovo in 2001 to provide 'provisional, democratic self-government'. On February 17, 2008, representatives of the people of Kosovo unilaterally declared Kosovo's independence and subsequently adopted the Constitution of Kosovo, which came into effect on 15 June 2008.

Members
The Assembly of the Republic of Kosovo is regulated by the Constitution of Kosovo and has 120 directly-elected members; 20 are reserved for national minorities as follows:
 10 seats for the representatives of the Serbs.
 4 seats for the representatives of the Romani, Ashkali and Egyptians.
 3 seats for the Bosniaks. 
 2 seats for the Turks.
 1 seat for the Gorans.

Albanian is the official language of the majority, but all languages of minorities such as Serbian, Turkish and Bosnian are used, with simultaneous interpretation.

Committees
The Assembly of the Republic of Kosovo in this legislature has a total of fourteen committees, the number of committees varies depending on the legislature.
Committee for Agriculture, Forestry, Rural Development, Infrastructure, Environment, Spatial Planning and Infrastructure
Committee for Budget, Labor and Transfers
Committee for Economy, Industry, Entrepreneurship and Trade
Committee for Education, Science, Technology, Innovation, Culture, Youth and Sports
Committee for European Integration
Committee for Foreign Affairs and Diaspora
Committee for Health and Social Welfare
Committee for Human Rights, Gender Equality, Missing Persons, Victims of War Sexual Violence and Petitions
Committee for Legislation, Mandates, Immunities, Rules of Procedure of the Assembly and Oversight of the Anti-Corruption Agency
Committee for Public Administration, Local Government, Media and Regional Development
Committee for Security and Defense
Committee for the Rights and Interests of Communities and Returns
Oversight Committee of the Kosovo Intelligence Agency
Public Finance Oversight Committee

Most recent election results

Notes
Notes about status

Other notes

References

External links
  
 Constitutional Framework

Government of Kosovo
Politics of Kosovo
Kosovo
Kosovo
2001 establishments in Kosovo